Fotiadis is a surname. Notable people with the surname include:

Alekhis Fotiadis (born 1967), Cypriot alpine skier
Andrew Fotiadis (born 1977), British footballer
Antonis Fotiadis (1899–?), Greek footballer
Eleftherios Fotiadis (born 1965), Greek footballer
Mikaela Fotiadis (born 1993), Greek–Dutch model
Pavlos Fotiadis (born 1964), Cypriot alpine skier